= WGNAM =

WGN may refer to:

- WGN (AM), a radio station (720 AM) licensed to Chicago, Illinois, United States
- WGN America, a cable television network that used this initialism within electronic guide listings prior to becoming NewsNation.
